Edmonds is a surname derived from the given name Edmond.

List of people surnamed Edmonds
 Barry Edmonds (1931–1982), American photojournalist
 Beth Edmonds, Maine State Senator
 Cecil J. Edmonds, British political officer
 Charles Edmonds, British World War I naval aviator and World War II air marshal
 Chase Edmonds (born 1996), American football player
 Duncan Edmonds, Canadian businessman and politician
 Edith Edmonds, (1874–1951), British artist  
 Ernest Harry Edmonds (1883–1962) "Harry Edmonds", a farmer politician in South Australia
 Fella Edmonds (b.1940), British child actor
 Francis William Edmonds (1806–1863), American painter
 George Edmonds (lawyer) (1788–1868), English lawyer
 George W. Edmonds, US Representative from Pennsylvania
 Jack Edmonds, Canadian mathematician and computer scientist
 James Edward Edmonds, British Official Historian of the Great War 1914–1918
 Jim Edmonds (born 1970), American baseball player and broadcaster
 John Edmonds (disambiguation)
 Kenneth Edmonds, better known as Babyface, (born 1959) American R&B musician and record producer
 Louis Edmonds, Louis Stirling Edmonds (1923–2001) American actor from Baton Rouge, Louisiana
 Lu Edmonds Robert David Edmonds (born 1957), English rock and folk musician
 Mike Edmonds (born 1944) English actor with dwarfism, "Little Ron" in children's series Maid Marian and Her Merry Men
 Noel Edmonds (born 1948) English broadcaster and executive
 Phil Edmonds (born 1951), English former cricketer and corporate executive
 Ray Edmonds (born 1936), English professional billiards and snooker player
 Richard Edmonds (born 1943), British Nationalist politician
 Richard Edmonds (scientist) (1801–1886), Cornish geologist & archaeologist
 Ronald Edmonds (1935–1983), American educational researcher
 Sibel Edmonds former FBI translator and founder of the National Security Whistleblowers Coalition
 Sandy Edmonds (born 1948), British-born pop singer in New Zealand and Australia
 Sarah Emma Edmonds, North American civil war - soldier, nurse, and spy
 Thomas Edmonds (disambiguation), several people
 Thomas Edmonds (tenor), Australian opera singer
 Thomas Rowe Edmonds, (1803–1889) English actuary and political economist
 Tracey Edmonds (born 1967) American businesswoman and television personality
 Walter D. Edmonds (1903–1998) American writer of historical novels
 Ward Edmonds (1908–1930), American athlete

Fictional people surnamed Edmonds
 Mertle Edmonds (Mildred Pearl "Mertle" Edmonds), Lilo Pelekai's main rival in Disney's Lilo & Stitch franchise.

See also
 Edmunds (surname)
 Edmond (disambiguation)
 Edmonds (disambiguation)

External links
 Edmonds DNA Project - Edmonds surname origin, family listing, genealogy, and lineage

English-language surnames
Patronymic surnames
Surnames from given names